Thuuz (derived from the word "enthusiast") is a sports discovery service that alerts users to sporting events via a proprietary "excitement rating."

History

The Thuuz website was launched September 2010 to help sports fans solve the problem of information overload by identifying the best content "...like your buddy who calls and tells you there’s a great game going on," according to Thuuz CEO Warren Packard.

On 15 September 2011, Thuuz released mobile applications for iOS and Android devices.

Beginning with the 2012 NFL season, Thuuz upgraded its apps to support fantasy sports, alerting fantasy team owners to news, plays and scoring involving their players.

Thuuz raised $4.2 million in Series A capital funding in September 2012.  They raised another $6.5 million in funding in June 2017.

Thuuz became a part of Stats Perform in 2020.

Overview

Thuuz attempts to create an objective rating for each game by analyzing live feeds of play-by-play statistics, and measuring six different factors: pace, parity, momentum, social media buzz, novelty and context. Proprietary algorithms process this data and rate games on a color-coded 0-100 point excitement scale. The score 0-39 is rated as "dull", 40-64 as "OK", 65-84 as "Good" and 85-100 as "Great" with the color becomes darker red as the score increases. Real-time and archived game ratings are displayed. Thuuz also forecasts the ratings for the upcoming games as well.

Thuuz sends registered fans live alerts by SMS text or email, permitting a user to tune into a game of interest.  Fans may personalize the sports and leagues they are interested in, list favorite teams, and the level of excitement at which they wish to receive an alert.

Thuuz has teamed with partners such as Dish Network and Google TV to integrate Thuuz ratings with televised sports, helping interactive TV viewers to discover, watch, and record exciting games.

Post-game ratings provide guidance for fans who have recorded multiple events for time-shifted viewing or who wish to watch televised or online replays. Game results are not displayed, so fans can choose the best games to watch without losing the element of suspense, and avoid wasting time on games that turn out to be dull.  Thuuz will also suggest the best point in each game to start watching.

Thuuz also employs its algorithms to offer predictions on which upcoming games are anticipated to be most exciting.

By aggregating minute-by-minute excitement ratings over the course of a season, Thuuz generates lists of the most exciting games, teams, leagues performances, and players which offer a different perspective than traditional statistics.

Their sole competitor is Are You Watching This?!.

Coverage

Professional sports 
 Baseball
Major League Baseball
 Basketball
 National Basketball Association
 Football
National Football League
 Ice hockey
National Hockey League
 Cricket
 Indian Premier League
 Association football
 Premier League
 La Liga
 Bundesliga
 Serie A
 Campeonato Brasileiro Série A
 Ligue 1
 Eredivisie
 Liga MX
 Major League Soccer
 Copa del Rey
 EFL Championship
 Copa Libertadores
 Süper Lig
 Primeira Liga
 First League
 Scottish Premiership
 Belgian First Division A
 US Open Cup
 Tennis
 ATP Tour (Men's)
 WTA Tour (Women's)
 Golf
 PGA Tour (Men's)

US college sports 
 NCAA Basketball (Men's)
 NCAA Football

International competitions 
 Cricket
 ICC World Cup
 Indian Premier League
 Rugby
 Rugby World Cup
 Heineken Cup
 Soccer
 UEFA Champions League
 UEFA European Football Championship
 FIFA World Cup (Men's and Women's)
 CONCACAF Champions League
 CONCACAF Gold Cup
 English Football League Cup

References

External links

Privately held companies based in California
American sport websites
Internet properties established in 2010